Marija Marović (born 16 September 1983) is a Croatian sports shooter. She competed in the women's 10 metre air pistol event at the 2016 Summer Olympics.

References

External links
 

1983 births
Living people
Croatian female sport shooters
Olympic shooters of Croatia
Shooters at the 2016 Summer Olympics
Place of birth missing (living people)
European Games competitors for Croatia
Shooters at the 2015 European Games
21st-century Croatian women